Babie Doły  is a village in the administrative district of Gmina Zblewo, within Starogard County, Pomeranian Voivodeship, in northern Poland.

For details of the history of the region, see History of Pomerania.

Trapped Man

In 1951 a German soldier was found alive after being trapped with five comrades following the dynamiting of their underground storehouse in 1945. They are believed to have been looting the storehouse and the retreating soldiers who dynamited the tunnel did not know they were there. The stores contained a large amount of food, drink, candles and other goods so the soldiers were able to survive. Four of the soldiers died (two suicides soon after being trapped, two unknown causes) leaving only two survivors. One of them suffered a heart attack and died upon leaving the tunnel. The final soldier was said to have made a full recovery, but his identity was never revealed.

The story inspired a novel called Le Blockhouse by French author Jean-Paul Clébert which was made into a film of the same name in 1973.

References

Villages in Starogard County